The 2004/05 FIS Nordic Combined World Cup was the 22nd world cup season, a combination of ski jumping and cross-country skiing organized by FIS. It started on 27 Nov 2004 in Kuusamo, Finland and ended on 13 March 2005 in Oslo, Norway.

Calendar

Men 

*=planned team event replaced with individual; **=planned individual event replaced with sprint

Team

Standings

Overall 

Standings after 17 events.

Sprint 

Standings after 8 events.

Warsteiner Grand Prix 

Standings after 3 events.

Nations Cup 

Standings after 18 events.

References

External links
FIS Nordic Combined World Cup 2004/05 

2004 in Nordic combined
2005 in Nordic combined
FIS Nordic Combined World Cup